Campanelli Stadium is a stadium in Brockton, Massachusetts. It is primarily used for baseball and is the home field of the Brockton Rox baseball team of the Futures Collegiate Baseball League summer league. The stadium opened in 2002 and holds 6,000 people.

Campanelli Stadium, along with the Brockton Rox, celebrated its 10th anniversary season in 2011.

During Sunday afternoon home games, family fun festivals are held prior to the first pitch. Activities include face painting, balloon artists, and catch on the field. After the game, children are able to run the bases and receive autographs from the Rox players, who stand along the warning track on the third base side. On Kids Eat Free Mondays, children receive a voucher for food with the purchase of a box seat. The Rox also host Thirsty Thursday at the ballpark, with specials on draft beers in the Right Field Beer Garden for $2. Also, the Rox host Friday Night Fireworks after all Friday night games.

The venue is also used for medium to large scale concerts and other events. Major music acts such as Jack Johnson, Willie Nelson, Bob Dylan, and B52s have all played at Campanelli. Other events, including The Jonas Brothers' Roadogs Softball Game, and Kevin Faulk Celebrity Softball Game are also help at the facility. The stadium also hosts small scale events, such as Boy Scout overnights. The Brockton High School baseball games, select Boston College Eagles baseball games, and the Baseball Beanpot (Boston College, UMass Amherst, Northeastern, and Harvard). In 2005, Campanelli Stadium hosted the 100 Inning Game benefit for Curt Schilling's charity Curt's Pitch for ALS. In 2014, Campanelli Stadium began hosting several of the inaugural MIAA Super Eight baseball games.

Attached to the stadium is the  Shaw's Conference Center, a facility which hosts numerous social functions. The combined minor league baseball stadium and banquet facility is one of only two such complexes in the nation.

External links
 Ballpark Reviews Webpage on Campanelli Stadium

Baseball venues in Massachusetts
Minor league baseball venues
High school baseball venues in the United States
Buildings and structures in Brockton, Massachusetts
Sports in Brockton, Massachusetts
Tourist attractions in Plymouth County, Massachusetts
Futures Collegiate Baseball League ballparks
2002 establishments in Massachusetts
Sports venues completed in 2002